Ioulia Chtchetinina (born 24 December 1995) is a Russian-born Hungarian pair skater who competes with Márk Magyar. Together, they are three-time Hungarian national champions (2020–22). Having formerly represented Switzerland with previous skating partner Noah Scherer, Chtchetinina won three international medals and competed at two World Championships. In mid-May 2017, the Swiss skating federation announced that they had parted ways,. She competed in the 2017–2018 season with Mikhail Akulov.

Programs

With Magyar

With Akulov

With Scherer

Competitive highlights 
CS: Challenger Series

Pairs with Magyar for Hungary

Pairs with Akulov for Switzerland

Pairs with Scherer for Switzerland

Ladies' singles for Switzerland

References

External links 
 
 

1995 births
Living people
Sportspeople from Nizhny Novgorod
Hungarian female pair skaters
Swiss female pair skaters
Russian emigrants to Hungary
Russian emigrants to Switzerland
Russian expatriate sportspeople in Switzerland
Naturalised citizens of Switzerland